The following is a list of the 259 communes of the French department of Yvelines.

The communes cooperate in the following intercommunalities (as of 2020):
CU Grand Paris Seine et Oise
CA Cergy-Pontoise (partly)
Communauté d'agglomération Rambouillet Territoires
Communauté d'agglomération Saint Germain Boucles de Seine (partly)
CA Saint-Quentin-en-Yvelines
Communauté d'agglomération Versailles Grand Parc (partly)

 (partly)

(CAS) Communauté d'agglomération de Saint-Quentin-en-Yvelines, created in 2004

References

Yvelines